Harutaeographa marpha is a moth of the family Noctuidae. It is found in Nepal and the Himalaya.

References

Moths described in 1999
Orthosiini